The Alhambra Theatre is a Moorish Revival movie theater building at 2330 Polk Street in San Francisco, California, that opened on November 5, 1926. The theater was designed by Miller & Pflueger (architect Timothy L. Pflueger also designed the Castro Theater and the Paramount Theater in Oakland, California).

The Alhambra Theatre once had 1,625 seats when it opened and cost $500,000. It was later converted to twin theaters in 1976. It reopened as a single screen in 1988 and finally closed as a movie theater on February 22, 1998. It was designated official San Francisco landmark #217 on February 21, 1996.

The building is now occupied by Crunch Fitness. The conversion to the gym has retained most of the interior detail, and movies are shown on the still-present big screen. The balcony retains the aisles, which have been widened, although there are only four. They accommodate about 80 cardio machines facing the screen.

References

External links

 Alhambra Theater at Cinema Treasures
   Historic Photos at SF Main Library Online Collection
 List of SF Landmarks, Including the Alhambra
 Alhambra Theater at Noehill.com

Cinemas and movie theaters in the San Francisco Bay Area
Theatres in San Francisco
Russian Hill, San Francisco
San Francisco Designated Landmarks
Event venues established in 1926
1926 establishments in California
Theatres completed in 1926
Moorish Revival architecture in California